Plains Cree may refer to:
 Plains Cree language
 Plains Cree people

Language and nationality disambiguation pages